Al-Hakam or Al-Hakum may refer to:

Hakam, one of the names of God in Islam

People
Al-Hakam I (died 822), Córdoban emir
 Al-Hakam II (915–976), caliph of Córdoba
 Sulayman ibn al-Hakam (died 1016), caliph of Córdoba
 Al-Hakim bi-Amr Allah (985–1021), Fatimid caliph of Cairo
 Al-Hakam ibn Abi al-'As (c. 600), father of Umayyad caliph Marwan I and uncle of Uthman ibn Affan
 Ibn 'Abd al-Hakam, Egyptian historian

Other
 Al Hakam (newspaper), English-language, Islamic newspaper, published weekly by the Ahmadiyya Muslim Jamaat
Al Hakum (Iraq), former biological weapons factory, Iraq

See also
 Hakim (disambiguation)